Special elections to the United States Senate are held to fill the vacancies that occur when a senator dies or resigns before the completion of their six-year term. Winners of these special elections typically serve the remainder of the term of the senator who has caused the vacancy. General elections to the U.S. Congress are held in November of even-numbered years. New Congresses convened on March 4 of the following year until 1934, and since then, new Congresses have begun on January 3 of the following year.

Because of the cost of conducting a special election, most states hold elections to fill a Senate vacancy in conjunction with the next general election, while some states, such as Alabama and Texas, allow for special elections to the Senate to be held before a general election (similar to special elections to the U.S. House of Representatives, though special elections are on a state-wide basis). Special elections can alter the balance of power in the Senate, as can temporary appointments.

Appointments by governors
Prior to ratification of the Seventeenth Amendment to the United States Constitution in 1913, most state legislatures elected senators (Sen.), as well as replacement senators. Some states empowered their governor to make temporary appointments until the legislature was in session.

The Seventeenth Amendment now requires the governor (Gov.) of the state to issue a writ for a special election to fill a vacant Senate seat, but no timeframe is specified in the provision for when the special election is to be held. State legislatures may also empower the governor to fill a vacancy by a temporary appointment until the winner of the special election is certified. The constitution does not set out how the temporary appointee is to be selected (e.g., there is no federal requirement that the appointee be of the same party, as happened most recently in New Jersey in 2013), and the state legislature can legislate as to how the replacement is to be selected.

North Dakota, Oregon and Wisconsin do not empower their governor to make temporary appointments and require special elections. Between 2004 and 2008, Massachusetts denied the power of the governor to appoint a replacement; in 2004, the Democratic-controlled legislature wanted to limit the power of the Republican governor (Gov. Mitt Romney) to appoint a successor to then-senator John Kerry if he were elected president that year. With the death of Sen. Ted Kennedy, the legislature chose to revert the rules to allow the Democratic governor (Gov. Deval Patrick) to appoint a temporary replacement senator while awaiting the results of a special election to complete the existing term. Hawaii allows the governor to appoint an interim senator "who serves until the next regularly-scheduled general election, chosen from a list of three prospective appointees that the prior incumbent's political party submits". Alaska in 2004 enacted conflicting legislation and a separate ballot referendum law that took effect on the same day. It is uncertain if the Alaska governor may successfully appoint an interim senator to serve until the mandated special election occurs 60 to 90 days after the vacancy happens. The ballot-approved law fails to specifically authorize the governor to appoint, though the legislative law does. Since 2021, Oklahoma permits its governor again to appoint a successor who is of the same party as the previous senator for at least the preceding five years when the vacancy arises in an even-numbered year, only after the appointee has taken an oath not to run in either a regular or special Senate election.

List of special elections
This is an incomplete list of special elections to the United States Senate. The list only includes vacancies that were filled by special election. Not included are those situations in which vacancies were only filled by appointment or general election, or new seats.

See also
 List of appointed United States senators
 List of special elections to the United States House of Representatives

Notes

References

External links
 Biographical Directory of the United States Congress 1774 – 2005 Contains complete listing of all Congresses

 
Special elections
United States